Mallobathra aphrosticha is a moth of the family Psychidae. This species is endemic to New Zealand and has been collected in Fiordland, Otago and Southland. The adults are on the wing in December and the female is semi-apterous.

Taxonomy 
This species was first described by Edward Meyrick in 1912 and named Telapora aphrostcha, a misspelling in the original publication. He used specimens collected by Alfred Philpott at Hump Ridge in Fiordland at an altitude of 3500 ft. Not long after publication, the spelling of aphrosticha was used in scientific literature to refer to this species. Dugdale discussed this misspelling stating that the appropriate spelling of the species name is aphrositcha as indicated by Mayrick's handwriting on a specimen label. In 1971 this species was placed within the genus Mallobathra. This name was confirmed by the New Zealand Inventory of Biodiversity.

Description 

Meyrick described the adults of this species as follows:
The female of this species is semi-apterous.

Distribution 

This species is endemic to New Zealand. It has been collected in Fiordland, Otago and Southland.

Behaviour 
This species is on the wing in December.

References 

Moths described in 1912
Moths of New Zealand
Psychidae
Endemic fauna of New Zealand
Taxa named by Edward Meyrick
Endemic moths of New Zealand